The 1917 All-Ireland Senior Hurling Championship was the 31st staging of the All-Ireland hurling championship since its establishment by the Gaelic Athletic Association in 1887. The championship began on 24 June 1917 and ended on 28 October 1917.

Tipperary were the defending champions, however, they were defeated on a 5–4 to 4–2 score line by Dublin in the All-Ireland final.

Format

All-Ireland Championship

Final: (1 match) The winners of the Leinster and Munster championships contested this game.  The winner was declared All-Ireland champions.

Results

Leinster Senior Hurling Championship

Munster Senior Hurling Championship

All-Ireland Senior Hurling Championship

Championship statistics

Miscellaneous

 In the Munster semi-final between Tipperary and Clare, the Clare team walk off midway through the match after a dispute. As Tipperary were winning by a sizable margin at the time they were declared the winners. 
 Dublin's defeat of Tipperary in the All-Ireland final is their first championship victory over the premier county. As of 2014 it remains their only championship victory over Tipperary. It was also Dublin's first All-Ireland win since 1889.

Sources

 Corry, Eoghan, The GAA Book of Lists (Hodder Headline Ireland, 2005).
 Donegan, Des, The Complete Handbook of Gaelic Games (DBA Publications Limited, 2005).

External links
 1917 All-Ireland Senior Hurling Championship results

References

1917